The Mayor of Wirral (or Civic Mayor of Wirral) is a ceremonial post elected annually, along with a deputy, by Wirral Metropolitan Borough Council.

The role of the mayor includes chairing council meetings, representing the Borough at civic functions, supporting local charities and conferring Honorary Freemen and Aldermen.

The incumbent mayor and deputy mayor are George Davies and Jeff Green.

Controversies
On 2 June 2014, 5 councillors (4 Conservative and 1 Green) voted against former leader of the council Steve Foulkes's nomination for mayor with a further 10 (all Conservative) abstaining. Leader of the Council Phil Davies said afterwards “It leaves a bad taste in the mouth, it was just grandstanding by the Tories.” Green councillor Pat Clearly wrote in his blog “On Monday [2 June], Wirral elects its new Mayor. Normally, a routine vote where a long standing councillor is elected with cross party support…but, this year is different as the Mayor elect is Steve Foulkes who was Council Leader when Wirral became very publicly associated with 
incompetence, bullying, gagging clauses, resignations and bad financial management”.

List of mayors of Wirral

20th century

21st century

References

Wirral
Politics of the Metropolitan Borough of Wirral